WFEC-LP (103.1 FM) is a radio station licensed to Winston-Salem, North Carolina, United States, it serves the Piedmont Triad area.  The station is currently owned by Iglesia Bautista El Camino.  It airs a Spanish language Religious radio format.

The station was assigned the WFEC-LP call letters by the Federal Communications Commission on April 8, 2004.

References

External links
 

FEC-LP
FEC-LP
FEC-LP
Radio stations established in 2004
FEC-LP
2004 establishments in North Carolina
Mass media in Winston-Salem, North Carolina